Within the North American recreational boating community, the term Power Squadron is used colloquially to refer either to the national body or to any local chapter of the following organizations:

 Canadian Power and Sail Squadrons
 United States Power Squadrons